The Twenty Tour (also known as the 20th Anniversary Tour) was the thirteenth concert tour by Irish pop vocal group, Westlife. It began on 22 May 2019 in Belfast, Northern Ireland at the SSE Arena and concluded on 15 September 2019 in Hyde Park, London, consisting of 33 shows in Europe and 17 shows in Asia. Westlife sold a total of 617,146 tickets for this tour.

Background and production 
Since their last concert tour and split in 2012, several rumours about the band reuniting and going on a tour had surfaced over the years. In 2017, band member Nicky Byrne talked about touring with the group again and said, "Who wouldn't want to do that again? The laugh with the boys and travelling around and seeing all the fans again. It's nearly six years next summer since we've done it so who knows? Maybe in ten years. I'm sure it will happen but I don't know when and I know know if even we know when the right time will be." In September 2018, several Irish news outlets began to report  that the group has been signed to Universal Music Group and Virgin EMI Records for a new tour deal. Alongside, leaked advertisements like from TickX about their upcoming tour had surfaced.

On 3 October 2018, the band officially announced their reformation with new music and tour. Byrne and lead vocalist Shane Filan added: "We still have a lot that we want to achieve as a band and we want to bring our new music to fans all over the world.", "While we were away, we realised what Westlife really meant to the fans — and to us." Later that month, the first confirmed dates of the tour were announced through the band's social networks. Pre-sale for tickets started at 9am GMT on 23 October 2018. Multiple extra dates were later added due to a high demand.

The Cirque Du Soleil designing team, which specialises in aerial acrobats, were hired for the tour. Filan commented that "the new show had to be bigger and better than ever before".

The concert tour in one of the dates in Croke Park, Dublin, Ireland was recorded in a video album in different formats and was released in March 2020. As of 29 September 2021, it appeared in the Irish Chart Top 5 for 73 weeks and 43 weeks at #1. While it was in the UK Top 50 for 77 weeks and 18 weeks at #1.

Set list
This set list is representative of the 22 May 2019 show in Belfast. It does not represent all dates of the tour.

 "Hello My Love"
 "Swear It Again"
 "What About Now"
 "My Love"
 "When You're Looking Like That"
 "Uptown Girl"
 "Mandy"
 "If I Let You Go"
 "Home"
 "Better Man"
 Queen Medley: "Another One Bites the Dust" / "Radio Ga Ga" / "I Want to Break Free" / "Somebody to Love" / "Don't Stop Me Now" / "We Will Rock You" / "We Are the Champions"
 "I Have a Dream"
 "Unbreakable"
 "Fool Again"
 "Queen of My Heart"
 "What Makes a Man"
 "Dynamite"
 "You Raise Me Up"
Encore
"Flying Without Wings"
 "World of Our Own"
 
Dynamite was performed on the Croke park gigs and on 
the rest of the tour

Tour dates

Personnel

Vocals 

 Shane Filan
 Mark Feehily
 Kian Egan
 Nicky Byrne

Band 

Simon Ellis - Keyboards / Musical Director
Phil Short - Guitar
Freddie Thompson - Bass
Jonathan "Ginger" Hamilton - Drums

Crew 

 Brian Burke - Tour Director & Production Designer
Simon Ellis - Musical Director

References

Notes

Citations

External links
 

Westlife concert tours
2019 concert tours